Petar Georgiev (Bulgarian: Петър Георгиев; born 10 May 2002) is a Bulgarian footballer who plays as a midfielder for Ludogorets Razgrad.

References

External links
 

2002 births
Living people
Bulgarian footballers
Bulgaria youth international footballers
PFC Ludogorets Razgrad II players
PFC Ludogorets Razgrad players
First Professional Football League (Bulgaria) players
Association football midfielders